Anna Danilina and Ulrikke Eikeri were the defending champions, but Danilina chose not to participate. Eikeri partnered alongside Tereza Mihalíková and successfully defended her title, defeating Han Xinyun and Alexandra Panova in the final, 7–6(10–8), 6–2.

Seeds

Draw

Draw

References

External links
 Draw

Grand Est Open 88 - Doubles